Gomola is a surname. Notable people with the surname include:

 Adam Gomola (born 1972), Polish ski mountaineer
 Jan Gomola (1941–2022), Polish footballer
 Roman Gomola (born 1973), Czech bobsledder

See also
 

Polish-language surnames